Field marshal was the highest rank in the military of Uganda, during the regime of Idi Amin.

History of the rank
On 17 July 1975, Idi Amin, President of Uganda and the commander-in-chief of the country's military at the time, the Uganda Army (UA), awarded himself the rank of field marshal. Officially, the rank was given to Amin by the Defence Council (which he himself chaired). Amin was then decorated with the rank insignia by Maj. Gen. Mustafa Adrisi at a function held at the State House in the capital, Entebbe.

Present status
Presently, the highest ranking individual in the current Ugandan military, the Uganda People's Defence Force (UPDF) is President Yoweri Museveni, who uses the rank of general. In 2021, there were calls by Defence Minister Charles Engola to promote Museveni to the rank of field marshal as well. The UPDF announced that Museveni will be awarded the rank in the next promotions.

See also

 Military history of Uganda
 Uganda Army (1962–1971)
 Uganda Army (1971–1980)
 Rank insignia of the Ugandan People's Defense Force

References

Military of Uganda
Uganda
Uganda
1975 establishments in Uganda